The Pine Belt, also known as the Piney Woods, is a region in Southeast Mississippi. The region gets its name from the longleaf pine trees that are abundant in the region. The Pine Belt includes 9 counties: Covington, Forrest, Greene, Jefferson Davis, Jones, Lamar, Marion, Perry, and Wayne.

History 

Before the arrival of Europeans, the area that would later become the state of Mississippi was populated by several Native American tribes, including the Natchez and Pascagoula in the Pine Belt. The population of these Native Americans declined as a result of armed conflicts with the Europeans, attrition from diseases, or coalescence with other tribes.

In 1817, the western portion of the Mississippi Territory was admitted to the Union as the State of Mississippi. Yet, the vast longleaf pine resource in Mississippi's Pine Belt remained mostly undisturbed, because there was no efficient system for transporting cut timber to sawmills for processing into lumber. That changed in the late 1800s, when railroads were built throughout the Pine Belt. These railroads provided an inexpensive means for moving passengers as well as logs and lumber, and opened Mississippi's Pine Belt to both industrial growth and community development. Notable railway construction during this era included the Gulf and Ship Island Railroad; New Orleans and Northeastern Railroad; and the Mobile, Jackson and Kansas City Railroad. The Pine Belt's booming timber industry ended around 1930, when the virgin pine forests were depleted. 

As World War I raged in Europe, military training sites were being created throughout the United States. As part of that effort, one of those training sites was established in the Pine Belt south of Hattiesburg in 1917. Over time, that training site transformed into Camp Shelby Joint Forces Training Center.

Geography 
As of 2020, Mississippi's Pine Belt had a population of 306,672 and an area of about 5,200 mi2 (13,400 km2). In the U.S. House of Representatives, the area is split between Mississippi's 3rd and 4th congressional districts.

Principal cities and towns

Education 

Universities
The University of Southern Mississippi 
William Carey University

Community colleges
Pearl River Community College
Jones County Junior College 
Southwest Mississippi Community College
Copiah-Lincoln Community College

Media

Newspapers, magazines, and journals

Laurel Leader-Call
Hattiesburg American 
The Times
Enterprise-Journal

Television
Hattiesburg - WDAM 7 
Hattiesburg - WHLT 22
Hattiesburg - WHPM 23

Transportation

Airports
Hattiesburg-Laurel Regional Airport

Interstates
Interstate 55
Interstate 59

Highways
U.S. Highway 11
U.S. Highway 49
U.S. Highway 84
U.S. Highway 98

Notable people

See also
 Belt regions of the United States
 Mississippi Gulf Coast

References

Regions of Mississippi
Natural history of Mississippi
Belt regions of the United States